The 24th European Trampoline Championships were held at the Pavilhão Multiusos de Guimarães in Guimarães, Portugal, from April 7–13, 2014.

The championships also served as a qualification event for 2015 European Games.

Medal summary

Medal table

Results

References

External links

European Trampoline Championships
Trampoline European Championships
2013
International gymnastics competitions hosted by Portugal